John Maxwell was a college football player.

Clemson College

Football
Maxwell was an All-Southern quarterback for John Heisman's Clemson Tigers of Clemson University, a member of its athletic Hall of Fame.

1902
Maxwell started every game in 1902. The Tigers closed the season with an 11 to 0 win over the Tennessee Volunteers. Tennessee back A. H. Douglas holds the record for the longest punt in his school's history, when he punted a ball 109 yards (the field length was 110 yards in those days) with the help of the wind during the Clemson game. Heisman described the kick:

Both Maxwell and Douglas were selected All-Southern in different publications.

1903
He returned the kickoff to open the second half 100 yards for  Clemson's first score in the 1903 game with Cumberland billed as the championship of the South which ended in an 11–11 tie. It was John Heisman's last game as Clemson head coach.

Baseball
He was also a catcher on the baseball team.

References

Year of birth missing
Year of death missing
American football quarterbacks
Clemson Tigers football players
All-Southern college football players
Clemson Tigers baseball players
Baseball catchers